Eldra Mary Jarman born Eldra Mary Roberts (4 September 1917 – 24 September 2000) had south Asian heritage as she was a Kale (Welsh Roma) harpist and author. She is known for the books she researched on the Welsh Romani heritage and her knowledge of the triple harp. Her memoirs were made into a film.

Life
Jarman was born in Aberystwyth in 1917 and her parents were Edith and Ernest France Roberts. Her family lived in a house but both of her parents had Roma heritage and the family had started to integrate and become "house gypsies". Her mother, Edith (born Howard), had not lived in a house until she was ten. Jarman had a special childhood as her playmate was her brother who was ten years older than her and she did not mix with other children. She learned about fishing, ferrets, dogs and how to net rabbits. Her mother was the source of oral traditions with stories about folklore. Her grandfather, Reuben Roberts, had been a harpist and her father was employed as the regimental harpist for the South Wales Borderers. He was a talented harpist who was trusted to do his own arrangements and Eldra learned how to play by watching him.

She married Alfred Owen Hughes Jarman in 1943. He was a Welsh speaker and she learnt that language. She had not considered herself to be Welsh but to be Roma, but she joined the Welsh nationalist party.

By 1949 they were living in Cardiff and Jarman used her time to research her heritage. She was able to call upon the work done by John Sampson and Dora Esther Yates who were Romani scholars. She was also able to add her own family's knowledge. In 1979 they published Y Sipsiwn Cymreig . She appears to have done a lot of the work and she credits her husband and co-author for pulling all the work together.

Jarman still knew many tunes on the harp although in some cases the tunes did not have names. She worked with the Bryn-mawr Dancers who had formed in 1952 and she would find the ideal tune for them as they danced. Sadly none of her children learned to play the harp, but they all learned to speak Welsh. In 1989 she published stories in Welsh for children which had a Roma Style titled Y gof a'r Diafol and it was illustrated by Suzanne Carpenter.

In 1991 she and her husband published The Welsh Gypsies: Children of Abram Wood. This was like Y Sipsiwn Cymreig, but it was in English and it contained additional detail.

Death and legacy
Jarman died in Pontypridd Cottage Hospital in 2000. In 2003 the film "Eldra" was screened that was based on her life and her memoirs.

References

1917 births
2000 deaths
People from Aberystwyth
Welsh women writers
Welsh harpists
Welsh Romani people
Welsh historians